Tafelberg (literally "Table Mountain") is one of the highest mountains in Suriname at . It is a tepui and is part of the Tafelberg Nature Reserve. The mountain is in the Sipaliwini District. The Rudi Kappel Airstrip, former name: Tafelberg Airstrip, is nearby. In 1943, the mountain was climbed for the first time by the Coppename River expedition lead by Dirk Geijskes.

Notable disasters
 In 1944 US Air Force Captain Atkinson while on a reconnaissance flight over the South of Suriname, had to make a crashlanding on the Tafelberg. Fortunately he was rescued after a few days by a military search and rescue expedition.
 On 25 October 1968 a Douglas C-47A PH-DAA of KLM Aerocarto flew into the Tafelberg following an engine failure whilst on a survey flight. The aircraft collided with the mountain in cloud, killing three of the five people on board.

References

External links
Google Maps - Tafelberg
Tafelberg expedition YouTube

Inselbergs of South America
Mountains of Suriname